Seth J. Putterman (born December 18, 1945) is an American physicist. He is known to have an eclectic approach to research topics that broadly revolves around energy-focusing phenomena in nonlinear, continuous systems, with particular interest in turbulence, sonoluminescence, sonofusion and pyrofusion.

Education and career 
Putterman studied physics at Cooper Union in New York for two years before transferring to the California Institute of Technology in Pasadena, graduating in 1966. In 1970 he received his doctorate under George Uhlenbeck at the Rockefeller University in New York. His PhD work dealt with quantum fluids and he contributed to the theory of superfluidity of helium.

Putterman is a Professor of Physics and Astronomy at the California NanoSystems Institute at the University of California, Los Angeles. His group demonstrated X-ray generation from the triboelectric effect by peeling a strip of Scotch tape in 2008.

Honors and awards 
Putterman received the Sloan Research Fellowship from the Alfred P. Sloan Foundation in 1972. He is a Fellow of the American Physical Society (1997) and the Acoustical Society of America.

See also 
 Sonoluminescence
 Pyroelectric fusion
 Rusi Taleyarkhan

References

External links 
 Video showing X-ray generation by peeling Scotch tape from Putterman's lab

Living people
1945 births
American physicists
University of California, Los Angeles faculty
Rockefeller University alumni
California Institute of Technology alumni
Cooper Union alumni
Fluid dynamicists
Sloan Fellows
People from New York City
Fellows of the American Physical Society